College Hall may refer to:

 College Hall, London
 The 14th-century dining hall of the Abbots of Westminster, used by Westminster School, London
 College Hall (Fayette, Iowa)
 College Hall (Michigan State University)
 College Hall (University of Southern Mississippi), a Mississippi Landmark
 College Hall (Rutgers University), New Brunswick, New Jersey
 College Hall (Tiffin, Ohio), listed on the National Register of Historic Places in Seneca County, Ohio
College Hall (Wilmington College), Wilmington, Ohio, listed on the National Register of Historic Places in Clinton County, Ohio 
 College Hall (La Salle University), Philadelphia
 College Hall (University of Pennsylvania), Philadelphia
 College Hall (Montpelier, Vermont)